Areacandona yuleae is a species of freshwater ostracod crustacean in the family Candonidae. It was originally described in 2007 from specimens collected from the Pilbara region in Western Australia, by Ivana Karanovic.

References 

Candonidae
Crustaceans described in 2007